Anthony Alozie (born 18 August 1986 in Aba, Abia, Nigeria) is an Australian track and field sprinter.  He was a member of the Australian  4 × 100 m relay team that equalled the Australian record when they qualified for the finals at the 2012 London Olympics.

Doping case
Alozie was in 2014 handed a 20-month suspension after whereabouts breaches and for missing a drug test.

References

External links
Profile  at London2012.com
Profile at Australian Olympic Team
Profile at Athletics Australia

1986 births
Living people
People from Aba, Abia
Doping cases in athletics
Doping cases in Australian track and field
Australian male sprinters
Athletes (track and field) at the 2012 Summer Olympics
Olympic athletes of Australia
World Athletics Championships athletes for Australia